Lemuel Russell Williams was an American baseball outfielder in the Negro leagues. He played from 1903 to 1914 with several teams.

References

External links

Cuban Giants players
Philadelphia Giants players
Date of birth missing
Date of death missing
Year of birth missing
Year of death missing
Baseball outfielders